Enteromius trispilopleura is a species of ray-finned fish in the genus Enteromius which is found in Lake Tana in Ethiopia.

References 

 

Endemic fauna of Ethiopia
Enteromius
Taxa named by George Albert Boulenger
Fish described in 1902